Linear verrucous epidermal nevus  is a skin lesion characterized by a verrucous skin-colored, dirty-gray or brown papule.  Generally, multiple papules present simultaneously, and coalesce to form a serpiginous plaque.  When this nevus covers a diffuse or extensive portion of the body's surface area, it may be referred to as a systematized epidermal nevus, when it involved only one-half of the body it is called a nevus unius lateris.

See also
 Inflammatory linear verrucous epidermal nevus
 Epidermis
 Skin lesion
 List of cutaneous conditions

References

External links 

 

Epidermal nevi, neoplasms, and cysts